Anthometra is a monotypic moth genus in the family Geometridae. Its only species, Anthometra plumularia, is found in southwestern Europe. Both the genus and species were first described by Jean Baptiste Boisduval in 1840.

References

Sterrhini
Geometridae genera
Monotypic moth genera